Donaspastus is a moth genus in the family Autostichidae.

Species
 Donaspastus bosellii (Hartig, 1941)
 Donaspastus delicatella (Walsingham, 1901)
 Donaspastus digitatus Gozmány, 1985
 Donaspastus liguricus Gozmány, 1977
 Donaspastus pannonicus Gozmány, 1952
 Donaspastus ubangi (Gozmány, 1966)

References

 
Symmocinae